Sengta Meesa, also spelled Sengta Meesa, is a village in Gosainganj block of Lucknow district, Uttar Pradesh, India. As of 2011, its population is 2,861, in 557 households. Sengta Meesa Scheduled Castes Population 80% Paswan 75% and Jatav 5%

References 

Villages in Lucknow district